Karl Owe Sandström (born September 28th, 1944) is a Swedish clothing designer, zoologist, safari leader, flamenco dancer, restaurateur, and florist. He is perhaps best known for designing many of the music group ABBA's stage outfits. Sandström is also known from television, as he participated in the Söndagsöppet segment "Hur gör djur" in the 1990s. He is also a teacher, having taught at the Spånga Gymnasium in Stockholm, where he specializes in nature and tropical animals. Sandström also came up with the opening number and show feature of Stockholm International Horse Show in Globen.

References

External links
Biography from ABBA

Living people
1944 births
Swedish costume designers
Swedish zoologists
Flamenco dancers
Florists
Swedish restaurateurs
Swedish television personalities